Mathru Devata is a 1969 Telugu-language drama film, produced by Atluri Purnachandra Rao and M. Chandra Sekhar under the Poorna Art Pictures banner and directed by Savitri. It stars N. T. Rama Rao and Savitri, with music composed by K. V. Mahadevan.

Plot
The film begins, Engineer Srinivasa Rao leads a happy family life with his wife Lakshmi (Savitri), mother Shantamma and daughter Latha. Srinivasa Rao is even admired by each and every person at his workplace expect Sivayya who always feels jealous about his success. So, he makes a ploy using his girlfriend Gauri, calls Srinivasa Rao to the railway track and tries to kill him. But unfortunately, he himself dies falling under the train and everyone thinks that Srinivasa Rao is dead and his desperate family leaves for the city. After that, Srinivasa Rao reaches Gauri's house, understands their plot, in that quarrel, Gouri dies and Srinivasa Rao flees. Thereafter, he goes into the trap of a gangster Mohan and he too reaches the city. In the city, Lakshmi, Shantamma and Lata get the support of a police constable Dharmayya, who gives them shelter. Years roll by, Latha becomes young and falls in love with Dharmayya's son Raja, a police officer, and their alliance is also fixed. Sheshavataram, who lives in their colony had an eye on this family. At a point in time, Lakshmi loses her job, so, Latha runs the family by giving dance performances. Once Mohan, the owner of the club tries to molest her when Srinivasa Rao comes to her rescue while dropping her, he recognizes his family and takes a promise to keep silent. There onwards, Srinivasa Rao regularly visits their house and takes care of his family. Sheshavataram takes advantage of the situation and spreads rumors about it. Meanwhile, Lakshmi becomes pregnant, even Dharmayya and Raja too suspect her chastity, then Shantamma explains entire truth to Dharmayya. At the same time, Sheshavataram instigates the public against Lakshmi, to keep her honor, Srinivasa Rao comes out and reveals his identity. Here Raja tries to arrest him, in the last minute, Dharmayya brings out the facts that Gouri is alive and the real culprit was Mohan. Finally, the movie ends on a happy note with the marriage of Raja & Latha.

Cast
N. T. Rama Rao as Srinivasa Rao
Savitri as Lakshmi
Shobhan Babu as Raja
Relangi as Seshavatham
Nagabhushanam as Dharmaiah
Prabhakar Reddy as Ram Mohan
Raja Babu as Devaiah
Jagga Rao as Sivaiah
Chandrakala as Latha
Vijaya Lalitha as Dancer
Hemalatha as Shantamma
Surabhi Balasaraswathi as Gowri

Soundtrack

Music composed by  K. V. Mahadevan. Music released by Audio Company.

References

Indian drama films
Films scored by K. V. Mahadevan